The 2018 National Challenge Cup final was a football match between Pakistan Air Force and WAPDA played on 10 May 2018 at KPT Football Stadium in Karachi. Pakistan Air Force won their second National Challenge Cup title after having won the first in 2014.

Road to final

Match

Details

References

Pakistan
National Challenge Cup final
May 2018 sports events in Pakistan